Sir Oliver Grantham Forster  (2 September 1925 – 3 November 1999) was a British diplomat.

Personal life 
He was educated at Hurstpierpoint College and King's College, Cambridge.

Career 
He joined the Foreign and Commonwealth Office in 1951 and later served as UK Ambassador to Pakistan from 1979 to 1984. He was made a Lieutenant of the Royal Victorian Order in 1961, Companion of the Order of St Michael and St George in 1976 and Knight Commander of that same order in 1983.

Honours
  Knight Commander of the Order of St Michael and St George (KCMG) - 1983

References

1925 births
1999 deaths
People educated at Hurstpierpoint College
Alumni of King's College, Cambridge
High Commissioners of the United Kingdom to Pakistan
Knights Commander of the Order of St Michael and St George